The Ultimate Poker Challenge (UPC) was a series of weekly poker tournaments acting as super-satellites into the series semi-finals.

The first and second seasons are available on NTSC DVD. In the United States, it was a syndicated program.

Format
Players are entitled to enter multiple super-satellite tournaments (entry into the semi-finals is transferable.)

Players can also qualify for the semi-finals based on the points leaderboard for their finishing position in each event. In the first season, "Silent" Steve Simmons placed highest on the points leaderboard and received $40,000. The second place finisher received $20,000.

Beginning with season 4, the show was renamed Ultimate Poker Challenge Presents Cash Poker: The Ultimate Gamble. The format changed from weekly tournaments to following the action at cash games.

Crew
Each tournament was commentated by Chad Brown, with Brandi Williams performing interviews along with intros and outros to commercial breaks. Daniel Negreanu provided cover for Chad Brown in episodes 19 and 20. Each tournament featured a professional poker player as a guest commentator, who would offer poker tips for the home viewer along with their commentary.

Beginning with season 4, Brian Mollica took over commentating duties with Williams continuing in her role as interviewer. Brown is frequently featured in the game.

The on-camera Poker Tournament Director starting in Season 2 was Brad Thomte.

Executive producer Dan Pugliese played in several tournaments throughout the series.

Results

Season 1

Season 2

Season 3

Television shows about poker
Poker in North America